Willian Osmar de Oliveira Silva (born 16 May 1993), known as Willian Oliveira or just Willian, is a Brazilian footballer who plays as a defensive midfielder for Goiás.

Honours
Goiás
 Campeonato Goiano: 2016

Chapecoense
 Campeonato Catarinense: 2020
 Campeonato Brasileiro Série B: 2020

References

External links
 
 

Living people
1993 births
Brazilian footballers
Association football midfielders
Campeonato Brasileiro Série A players
Campeonato Brasileiro Série B players
Fluminense FC players
Sport Club do Recife players
Goiás Esporte Clube players
Mirassol Futebol Clube players
América Futebol Clube (MG) players
Botafogo Futebol Clube (SP) players
Guarani FC players
Associação Chapecoense de Futebol players
Ceará Sporting Club players
Cruzeiro Esporte Clube players